Hating Alison Ashley is a 1984 Australian novel. (Puffin Books, London and Melbourne) Written by science fiction and children's author Robin Klein. Written as a preteen comedy, the book has a strong moral undercurrent about the pursuit of happiness and perfection, the pressures of growing up and the power of friendship. It portrays the agonies of school-girl rivalries, constant embarrassment by family, and painful and often brutally funny awkwardness and insecurity. One of Klein's most popular preteen novels, it has since become a standard English text for school students across Australia.

The book was nominated for 8 Australian literature awards and won the Young Australian Best Book Award (YABBA) in 1986 and the Kids Own Australian Literature Award (KOALA) in 1987.

It has since become a play, adapted by Richard Tulloch and directed by Nici Wood, and a film, Hating Alison Ashley directed by Geoff Bennett with Delta Goodrem in the title role.

Plot

Erica Yurken is an arrogant girl who believes herself superior to everyone in Baringa East, a council town that is dilapidated and mostly vandalised. She believes that she belongs in a more luxurious place and that she is destined to be a famous theatrical actress. Erica attends Baringa East primary where she is entering the 6th grade at the beginning of the novel, and she is distant towards the other students as she feels her intellect is far higher than theirs. Erica often creates highly exaggerated stories about herself to impress her classmates and hide the true lack of class in her family and is a hypochondriac, constantly visiting the School sickbay for made-up ailments. While many of the teachers at Barringa East primary are incompetent, her grade 6 teacher Miss Belmont is intelligent and disciplinary, and Erica thrives under her control. She outshines her classmates by putting effort in her projects, and just as her ego begins to bloom, a section of one of the upper-class estates surrounding Barringa East is reclassified as part of their suburb, and due to the zoning system a new student, Alison Ashley, is placed in Erica's class.

Alison Ashley is a beautiful, rich, neat and intelligent girl, traits that Erica instantly grows envious of. She is seated beside Erica in class and though at first Erica wants to impress Alison in the hopes that she will befriend Erica, her jealousy of the girl grows stronger throughout the day, until she finally pushes Alison away. Over the next few days, Alison's organisation and talent angers Erica until finally she snaps, offending Alison and calling her a snob.

On many occasions, Alison appears to want to instigate a friendship, though Erica stubbornly turns her away out of spite and envy. Alison visits Erica's house, and after Erica's family humiliates her several times she accuses Alison of being judgmental and nosy. Shortly after, Erica finds Alison's belongings mixed up with hers and begrudgingly returns them to her, envious of Alison's luxurious house and clean living which is the polar opposite of her own. Though Alison attempts to be friendly, Erica unintentionally wakes up Alison's mother who has a demanding late-night job, and after she furiously asks Alison who is with her, Alison quickly says "No one," something Erica views as the ultimate indignity and causes her to once again refuse to speak to Alison.

The two girls are later placed in a cabin and group together on the annual Grade Six camp. Erica is once again outdone and thus infuriated by Alison Ashley, particularly in the camp play, where she is horrified to discover that she, having always dreamed of being an actress, suffers from stage fright while Alison displays skill as an actress and is cast in the lead role. On performance she can not bear to watch Alison take the spotlight and flees to her cabin, where she is touched to find that Alison has compiled the script that Erica wrote for the play into a book as a gesture of friendship. Erica also discovers that although Alison was in the lead role, her mother did not bother to attend the camp performance night as she cared little about her daughter, revealing to Erica that Alison was genuinely envious of her chaotic but warm family life and making Erica reconsider her disdain for her family. Erica and Alison reconcile and become friends.

References

External links

 Hating Alison Ashley: Australian Children's Classics, Penguin Books

Novels by Robin Klein
1984 Australian novels
1984 children's books
Australian children's novels
Novels set in high schools and secondary schools
Australian novels adapted into films
Australian novels adapted into plays